Wong Jeh Shyan (Chinese: 黃哲賢;  ; Hakka Transliteration Scheme: Wong Yih Shun; Hakka Pha̍k-fa-sṳ: Vòng Che̍t-hèn; Jyutping: Wong1 Yi3 Sun4; pinyin: Húang Zhéxián), (born 17 November 1964) was the former-CEO of CommerceNet Singapore. He is currently the CEO of MOC Capital Berhad. Wong serves as Consulting Partner in CNSG Consulting Group.

Business ventures
Wong founded the ITCN Asia series (named after Infocomm Technologies CommerceNet Asia) in Karachi, first held in March 2001.

References

External links
 CNSG's web site

Malaysian people of Cantonese descent
1964 births
Living people
Malaysian businesspeople
People from Ipoh
Malaysian people of Hokkien descent
Malaysian people of Chinese descent
Malaysian people of Hakka descent
Singaporean businesspeople
People from Perak